Acahay is a town and distrito in the Paraguarí department of Paraguay.  At the 2017 census it had a population of 16,264.

References

Sources 
World Gazetteer: Paraguay – World-Gazetteer.com

Populated places in the Paraguarí Department